Sergio Buenacasa Alba (born 19 April 1996) is a Spanish footballer who plays for Hércules CF as a forward.

Club career
Born in Zaragoza, Aragon, Buenacasa joined FC Barcelona's youth setup in 2010, aged 14, after spells at Real Zaragoza and San Gregorio CD. On 30 August 2013 he moved to Juventus F.C. on a free transfer, being initially assigned to its Primavera squad.

On 31 August 2015, after spending the whole pre-season with Juventus' first team, Buenacasa returned to Zaragoza. Initially assigned to the reserves, he made his senior debut on 25 October, starting and scoring the opener in a 2–1 away win against CD Binéfar in the Tercera División.

On 7 December 2015 Buenacasa made his professional debut, coming on as a late substitute for Alfredo Ortuño in a 1–0 Segunda División away win against Bilbao Athletic. On 14 July 2017, he signed for Segunda División B side Barakaldo CF.

On 18 June 2018, after scoring 14 goals for Barakaldo, Buenacasa signed a three-year contract with RCD Mallorca in the second division. He contributed with only eight league appearances during the campaign, as his side achieved promotion to La Liga, and was loaned to second division side SD Ponferradina on 12 July 2019.

On 11 January 2020, after being rarely used, Buenacasa moved to fellow second tier side Málaga CF on loan for the remainder of the campaign. On 11 September, he signed a one-year deal with Hércules CF in the third tier.

References

External links

1996 births
Living people
Footballers from Zaragoza
Spanish footballers
Association football forwards
Segunda División players
Segunda División B players
Tercera División players
Real Zaragoza B players
Real Zaragoza players
Barakaldo CF footballers
RCD Mallorca players
SD Ponferradina players
Málaga CF players
Hércules CF players
Juventus F.C. players
Spanish expatriate footballers
Spanish expatriate sportspeople in Italy
Expatriate footballers in Italy